The 1986 Alaska Milkmen season was the first season of the franchise in the Philippine Basketball Association (PBA).

New team
Alaska Milk was accepted as a new member of the Philippine Basketball Association (PBA) entering its 12th.season. The league maintain a six-team field following the leave of absence by the Magnolia ballclub, one of the three founding members of the PBA. Alaska acquired Marte Saldaña, Rudy Distrito and Noli Banate from Magnolia and also signed up Magnolia coach Norman Black to a one-year contract as part of their coaching staff and import for the Third Conference. The other players acquired by the newest ballclub were Alejo Alolor, Frankie Lim and Teddy Alfarero from Great Taste, Arnie Tuadles and Ricky Relosa from Ginebra, and Dennis Abbatuan from Shell. The rookies are Rey Cuenco, the first overall draft pick, Naning Valenciano and Rey Ramos.

The ballclub's first head coach was former Atenean Tony Vasquez. In their very first conference, the Milkmen's imports were former best import winner Donnie Ray Koonce, who last played in the PBA three years ago in 1983, and Jerry Lee Eaves.

Occurrences
After leading Alaska to a fourth-place finish in the first conference, coach Tony Vasquez was replaced by assistant coach Cesar Jota beginning the All-Filipino Conference as he was set to handle De La Salle-Zobel in their UAAP debut season. Starting the second round of eliminations in the third conference, the Milkmen welcome back Tony Vasquez from the bench but his return was spoiled by Alaska's 111–114 loss to Manila Beer on October 19. Two more outings and the coaching job was assumed again by former San Bedan Cesar Jota following Vasquez' sudden passing.  

Donnie Ray Koonce teamed up with Norman Black in the Open (3rd) Conference. Koonce was replaced by Keith Morrison after playing five games.

Roster

Imports

References

Alaska Aces (PBA) seasons
Alaska